Júlíus Jónasson (born 1964) is an Icelandic handball player and coach. He played for the Iceland men's national handball team at the 1992 Summer Olympics in Barcelona, where the Icelandic team placed fourth.

Jónasson was the  head coach for the Iceland women's national handball team.

References

1964 births
Living people
Julius Jonasson
Handball players at the 1992 Summer Olympics
Julius Jonasson
Julius Jonasson